Donald David Washington III (born July 28, 1986) is a former American football defensive back. He played college football for the Ohio State Buckeyes and was drafted in the fourth round of the 2009 NFL Draft by the Kansas City Chiefs. He played high school football at Franklin Central High School in Indianapolis.

Washington has also played for the Toronto Argonauts and Hamilton Tiger-Cats.

College career
Washington enrolled at Ohio State in 2005, but spent the season performing on the scout team. He was named the team's Outstanding Freshman in 2006, starting nine games at boundary cornerback and nickel back in 2006. He produced 41 tackles (28 solos) with a stop behind the line of scrimmage. He also caused two fumbles and recovered another that he returned 48 yards.

As a sophomore, Washington moved to field cornerback, starting all 13 games. He registered 39 tackles (29 solos) that included his only sack as a Buckeye. He recovered a fumble, broke up two passes and returned an interception 70 yards for a touchdown. Washington was suspended for the team's first two games of the 2008 season for a violation of team rules. "I'll be honest and admit I made a mistake," he said. "That's the only way you can handle it. The best thing to do is just be honest."

When he returned, he spent most of the season as a reserve, starting two games at boundary cornerback. He managed just 22 tackles (18 solos) with a fumble recovery and a 34-yard interception return. Washington joined receiver Brian Hartline and running back Beanie Wells as three Ohio State underclassmen to declare for the 2009 NFL Draft.

Professional career

Kansas City Chiefs
Washington was drafted in the 4th round of the 2009 NFL Draft by the Kansas City Chiefs. Washington was on the Chiefs as a second string strong safety. In 2011, Washington finished his season with 25 tackles, 1 forced fumble, and one pass deflection. On August 31 Washington was cut by the Kansas City Chiefs after being pulled over by state police and found to be carrying marijuana and suspected MDMA. He was later charged with possession of a controlled substance and convicted of a Felony in the fourth degree.

Toronto Argonauts
On May 7, 2014, Washington was signed by the Toronto Argonauts of the Canadian Football League. During the 2014 CFL season, Washington recorded 14 defensive tackles and 1 special teams tackle.

On June 14, 2015, Washington was released by the Argonauts.

Pittsburgh Steelers
On May 7, 2016, Washington was signed by the Pittsburgh Steelers after receiving a tryout at their rookie minicamp. On September 3, 2016, he was released by the Steelers as part of final roster cuts.

References

External links
Ohio State Buckeyes bio
Kansas City Chiefs bio
Toronto Argonauts bio

1986 births
Living people
African-American players of American football
African-American players of Canadian football
American football cornerbacks
Canadian football defensive backs
Hamilton Tiger-Cats players
Kansas City Chiefs players
Ohio State Buckeyes football players
Pittsburgh Steelers players
Players of American football from Indianapolis
Players of Canadian football from Indianapolis
Toronto Argonauts players